The San Francisco SPCA (a Society for the Prevention of Cruelty to Animals) is an animal shelter, a spay/neuter clinic, and a full-service public animal hospital located in San Francisco.

History
The SFSPCA was founded on April 18, 1868 by a banker named James Sloan Hutchinson. He intervened in the inhumane behavior of two men who were dragging a squealing boar off to market along the street's rough cobblestones. The incident moved Hutchinson to call together a group of fellow humanitarians to found The San Francisco SPCA. The SFSPCA is now the oldest U.S. animal welfare organization in the West.

After the 1906 San Francisco earthquake, the SFSPCA built horse troughs throughout the City to provide water for horses employed in rescue and rebuilding efforts. Plaques memorializing the troughs remain in place as of 2006.

Relation with San Francisco Animal Care & Control
In 1989, the SFSPCA ended its 100-year-old contract to provide animal control services to the city of San Francisco. The San Francisco Animal Care & Control Department (SFACC) was created as a governmental agency. The SFSPCA was then able to focus its resources on pioneering programs for homeless dogs and cats. In 1994, SPCA and SFACC were able to provide the "adoptable guarantee". The SFSPCA pledged to take as many cats and dogs from SFACC as possible to find them a new home, no matter how long it took.

No-kill
The pact between The SFSPCA and San Francisco Animal Care and Control enabled animal advocates to implement a model that made San Francisco the first "no-kill city" in the United States. The SFSPCA will keep any cat or dog under its roof until a home is found for it. The only time an animal will be euthanized is if it is determined to be suffering medically or behaviorally.

The model includes a set of tactics that, in combination, reduce the number of animals entering the shelter system and place most shelter animals in permanent homes. Some of these tactics are mobile adoption outreach units, aggressive early spay-neuter programs, medical treatment for treatable shelter animals, behavioral training in the shelter, training classes for the public, and structured adoption screening and matching.

In 1998, the San Francisco SPCA opened Maddie's Pet Adoption Center, a facility that houses dogs and cats in condominium-style rooms featuring accoutrements such as television sets, cat trees, toys, and live aquariums. The facility is named for the pet Miniature Schnauzer of PeopleSoft founder Dave Duffield, who concentrates his philanthropy in the animal welfare world via the private foundation Maddie's Fund. The adoption center is located at 250 Florida Street in San Francisco, and is open Wednesday – Friday from 1:00 pm to 7:00 pm, and Saturday and Sunday from 10:00 am to 6:00 pm. Dogs and cats are available for adoption.

Current programs and services
In January, 2009, the San Francisco SPCA opened The Leanne B. Roberts Animal Care Center, which now houses The SFSPCA's veterinary services. It includes their nonprofit, full-service Veterinary Hospital, Spay/Neuter Clinic, Feral Fix Program and Shelter Medicine Program and Foster Care Program.

The San Francisco SPCA also partners with UniversalGiving, an online nonprofit organization to gather volunteers to help out in programs.

The Leanne Roberts Center is being funded entirely by private donors.

The hospital is located at 201 Alabama Street in San Francisco, and offers free client parking. The hospital is open 7 days a week from 8 am to 6 pm, offering full service appointments and emergency services.

Controversies
The SF SPCA has been involved in several controversial issues.  Some critics argue that the Society's "trap-neuter-release" approach to feral cat management can cause damage to bird life. Others oppose the organization's support for off-leash recreation for dogs in federal park lands in the San Francisco Bay Area, arguing that they disturb wildlife and are unsafe for children.

References

External links
 Official site
 The Adoption Pact between SF SPCA and SF Animal Care and Control

Animal shelters in the United States
Animal welfare organizations based in the United States
Non-profit organizations based in San Francisco